Highway 3B is an alternate loop to the Crowsnest Highway (Highway 3) between Nancy Greene Lake and an area called Meadows, just west of Erie on the Crowsnest. Originally, Highway 3B went between Nancy Greene Lake to Trail, where the Crowsnest picked up the route to the Meadows area. One of its original component sections, the Rossland and Nancy Greene Lake was opened on the 1st of October 1965 at a cost of $3.5 million (equivalent to $34.4 million in 2022) 

Originally, Highway 3B only went between Nancy Greene Lake and Trail, where the Crowsnest picked up the route to the Meadows area. However in 1978, Highway 3 was re-routed off the present-day Highway 3B alignment east of Trail because a new segment of Highway 3 between Castlegar and Meadows was opened.

Route details
Highway 3B's western terminus is at the Crowsnest Highway near Nancy Greene Lake.  The route travels 45 km (28 mi) southeast to the village of Rossland, where Highway 22 merges onto Highway 3B.  The two highways share the route for the next 10 km (6 mi) east to Trail, where Highway 22 diverges north, with Highway 22A following Highway 3B east for 7 km (4 mi) to its departure just west of the village of Montrose for the Waneta border crossing. Highway 3B proceeds northeast for 23 km (14 mi), through the villages of Montrose and Fruitvale, to the location of Meadows, where it again meets up with the Crowsnest.

Major intersections

See also
 Crowsnest Highway

External links

 Official Numbered Routes in British Columbia by British Columbia Driving & Transportation

References 

003B